Joseph I. Hutter (August 31, 1937 – April 18, 2015) was an American politician who was a member of the Iowa House of Representatives from 2003 to 2007. He represented the 82nd district.

He was born in Dubuque, Iowa, to Irvin and Marie Hutter (née Ryan). He served in the United States Navy from 1956 to 1958, then moved to Bettendorf, where he worked as a police officer until he retired in 1994. Hutter was appointed to the board of Hawk-i, on which he served until his death in 2015.

References

1937 births
2015 deaths
Republican Party members of the Iowa House of Representatives
American police officers
United States Navy sailors
People from Dubuque, Iowa
People from Bettendorf, Iowa